The 1968 German Open Championships was a combined men's and women's tennis tournament played on outdoor red clay courts. It was the 60th edition of the tournament, the first one in the Open Era, and took place at the Am Rothenbaum in Hamburg, West Germany, from 5 August through 13 August 1968. John Newcombe and Annette Du Plooy won the singles titles.

Finals

Men's singles
 John Newcombe defeated  Cliff Drysdale 6–3, 6–2, 6–4

Women's singles
 Annette Du Plooy defeated  Judy Tegart 6–1, 7–6

Men's doubles
 Tom Okker /  Marty Riessen defeated  John Newcombe /  Tony Roche 6–4, 6–4, 7–5

Women's doubles
 Annette Du Plooy /  Pat Walkden defeated  Winnie Shaw /  Judy Tegart 6–3, 7–5

Mixed doubles
 Annette Du Plooy /  Frew McMillan defeated  Pat Walkden /  Anderson 6–1, 12–10

References

External links
  
   
 Association of Tennis Professionals (ATP) tournament profile
 International Tennis Federation (ITF) tournament edition details

Hamburg European Open
German Open Championships
1968 in West German sport
1968 in German tennis